Giancarlo Snidaro (born 21 September 1954 in Pradamano) is a retired Italian footballer. He played as a central midfielder. After many years in Serie C1 he went to Atalanta and gained a promotion in Serie A in 1983-1984. After that he was sold to Piacenza. After retirement he managed Alzano youth teams.

Career
1972-1973  Alessandria 1 (0) 
1973-1974  Anconitana 23 (6) 
1974-1975  Alessandria 3 (1) 
1975-1976  Civitavecchia 34 (17) 
1976-1981  Reggina 152 (16) 
1981-1984  Atalanta 93 (4) 
1984-1988  Piacenza 103 (8) 
1988-1989  Trevigliese 27 (8)

External links
 Player profile

References

1954 births
Living people
Virtus Bergamo Alzano Seriate 1909 players
Association football midfielders
Italian footballers